Alias is a 3D third-person stealth/action video game developed by Acclaim Studios Cheltenham (being the last game developed by them before their closure) and published by Acclaim Entertainment for the PlayStation 2, Xbox and Microsoft Windows. It is based on the television series Alias. The plot was written by Breen Frazier and the game features the voices of the cast principals. The score was composed by Michael Giacchino, and adapted by Chris Tilton. The game was released in 2004, and has a rating of T. The game is set between episodes 19 and 20 of season 2.

Plot
When CIA agent, Sydney Bristow, is called in to work on her day off, she knows there must be something serious going down. The order came from the CIA's best mind: her father, Jack Bristow. A fellow operative, Agent Jacobs, has disappeared under suspicious circumstances. His last communiqué to the CIA contained highly sensitive intelligence regarding Sydney's nemesis, Anna Espinosa, formerly a top agent for K-Directorate, now gone rogue. While Sydney's been having free time, Anna has been busy - hard at work taking over the "Followers of Rambaldi" cult, a cabal of zealots hell bent on bringing the visions of 15th century philosopher, physicist and prophet, Milo Rambaldi, to life. Now, Anna has been teaming up with Julian Sark, a slippery and cunning gun-for-hire, along with Sydney's ex-boss, Arvin Sloane, a highly intelligent but utterly corrupt crime lord, and a man Sydney thoroughly despises.

Sydney is tasked with finding out what this trio of 'most wanted' fugitives is working on and discover exactly what "The Machine" is. She is ably assisted by her back-up team; Marcus Dixon, her field partner and loyal friend; Michael Vaughn, her CIA handler; and Marshall Flinkman, a socially inept technological whiz with a gadget for every occasion.

Starting in Agent Jacobs' last known location, a casino in Monte Carlo, Sydney locates a data disc in a dead drop. Hacking into a computer in the executive suite, she discovers that the casino's luxurious exterior hides a huge arms manufacturing facility in the basement. Now, Sydney has to acquire a laser prototype being tested there, sneak back into the casino to spy on a meeting between Anna and Sark, and finally escape from the casino grounds with armed enemies in hot pursuit.

Jacobs' data leads the team to a museum in Saudi Arabia proudly displaying new artifacts...a mysterious set of bones found in the desert with links to Rambaldi. When Sydney covertly enters the museum to acquire the bones, she finds that Anna has the same idea at the same time, except that Anna has brought her task force. Racing against Anna's forces, Sydney must collect all of the bones before getting a trace on a feeling Anna that takes them to ruins in the desert. Here, Sydney's best efforts are thwarted by Anna's underhanded tactics which force Sydney to put friendship before professional loyalty, and incidentally, disarm a rather large nuclear warhead.

While Sydney's been in the desert, Vaughn has tracked both missing agent Jacobs and a mathematician, Dr. Caplan, to an insane asylum in Romania, where prisoners are being held against their will. Breaking into the asylum, Sydney discovers that the prisoners are being used as human guinea pigs for Anna and Sark's experiments with their laser. After freeing Caplan and Jacobs, who in turn free the prisoners, Sydney initiates a daring plan to take Sark into custody and put an end to the experiments by starting a chemical reaction with the laser's components, which destroys the asylum when the reaction goes critical. The horrific truth about the experiments comes out as Caplan is debriefed back at the CIA.

Trading his intelligence for immunity, Sark tips the team off that Arvin Sloane is cutting a specific diamond to Anna's very precise specifications in a laboratory beneath an embassy in Hong Kong. Gaining admittance to the embassy by attending a glamorous party in the ballroom, Sydney gets into the cutting room and manages to acquire the diamond. She is forced to trade it for the lives of the innocent partygoers when Sloane appears on the scene and informs Sydney of the C-4 explosives he has placed around the embassy as insurance. Ignoring Sydney's warnings about Anna, he triggers a countdown on the bomb giving Sydney and Dixon just a few minutes to evacuate the embassy and get themselves to safety.

Tracing Anna to Rio de Janeiro, Sydney tails her to a nightclub where she is scheduled to meet with Sloan. Bugging a meeting between the two, Sydney finally manages to discover the true, awful potential about "The Machine," and its location in an underground bunker in Russia. As Anna marches off a double-crossed Sloane, the CIA operatives receive a surprise visit by the Followers of Rambaldi SWAT team. Realizing there is a mole within the agency, Vaughn attempts to stop the raid only to find that the leaks have come from the most unlikely of sources. The CIA team must regroup to draw up their final make-or-break plans to stop Anna's nefarious plan.

Following a HALO parachute jump insertion, Sydney must use all of the skills she has learned to infiltrate the bunker. By stealth, combat and quick-thinking, Sydney gets past Anna's forces and finds a captive Sloane. Reluctantly agreeing to an uneasy truce with him, Sydney must defeat Anna and figure out how to destroy the mighty Machine to stop ecological disaster being launched on the whole planet. As Anna's grand scheme and the bunker begin to collapse around her, Sydney has to push herself to the limit to escape with her life.

Alias: Underground
Prior to the Acclaim release, ABC Television produced a downloadable episodic video game for PC and Mac entitled Alias: Underground, which was available through ABC's website. Developed by a now-defunct company named Dream Mechanics, the game was a 3D third-person stealth/action game like the Acclaim production, though with comparably lower production values. Each level of the game was produced as an individual episode and released on a monthly basis during the second season between September 2002 and June 2003. Some levels resembled episodes from the TV series (such as "Raid on SD-6", based on first-season episode "The Box"), while others were unique creations. For a time, players were eligible to enter a contest based upon their score in the game.

Recently, ABC Media announced the ceasing of support for the online game, due to low usage, as the game was easy to complete and new levels were no longer being added. At one time the game was offered free of charge, but now ABC charges US$0.99 for each mission (excluding the training mission, which is still available for free download).

Reception

The game received "mixed" reviews on all platforms according to video game review aggregator Metacritic.

References

External links
 Q & A with J. J. Abrams about Alias: Underground
 

2004 video games
Acclaim Entertainment games
Alias (TV series)
PlayStation 2 games
Single-player video games
Spy video games
Stealth video games
Video games about cults
Video games based on television series
Video games developed in the United Kingdom
Video games featuring female protagonists
Video games scored by Michael Giacchino
Video games set in Brazil
Video games set in Hong Kong
Video games set in Monaco
Video games set in Romania
Video games set in Russia
Video games set in Saudi Arabia
Windows games
Xbox games